"I Know She Still Loves Me" is a song written by Aaron Barker and Monty Holmes, and recorded by American country music artist George Strait. It was released in December 1995 as the second and final single from his box set Strait Out of the Box. The song reached number 5 on the Billboard Hot Country Singles & Tracks chart in March 1996.

Chart performance
"I Know She Still Loves Me" debuted at number 57 on the U.S. Billboard Hot Country Singles & Tracks for the week of December 23, 1995.

Year-end charts

References

1995 singles
1995 songs
George Strait songs
Song recordings produced by Tony Brown (record producer)
Songs written by Monty Holmes
MCA Records singles
Songs written by Aaron Barker